The Remington XP-100 (from eXperimental Pistol number 100) is a bolt-action pistol produced by Remington Arms from 1963 to 1998.  The XP-100 was one of the first handguns designed for long-range shooting, and introduced the .221 Fireball and 6×45mm. The XP-100 was noted for its accuracy and is still viewed as competitive today in the sport of handgun varminting, which it helped create, as well as in metallic silhouette shooting.

Overview
The XP-100 was based on Remington's short action bolt action carbine, the Remington Model 40X, which influenced the later Remington Model 600 rifle.  The XP-100 was initially introduced with a  barrel set into a nylon stock with an unusual center-mounted grip.  Chambered in .222 Remington in early prototypes, the short barrel produced significant noise and muzzle flash. Subsequently the case was shortened to reduce powder capacity to a volume more suited to the shorter barrel of a pistol.  The resulting cartridge, the .221 Fireball, produced factory loaded velocities of over 825 m/s (2,700 ft/s) from the short barrel, and accuracy rivaling the parent .222 Remington, one of the most accurate cartridges made.

All but the XP-100R model were single-shot designs, while the XP-100R had a small internal magazine (holding four rounds), similar to most bolt-action rifles. The R model - for "repeater" - was made 1991-1997 in .223 Rem., .250 Savage, 7mm-08 Rem., .308 Win., .35 Rem., and 350 Rem. Mag. It was reintroduced in 1998, this time without sights, in .223 Rem., .22-250 Rem., .260 Rem., and .35 Rem.

Model history
The XP-100 went through a number of changes during its production run, and many variations were only available through the Remington Custom shop. Stocks with a rear grip uses standard Remington 700 triggers, while stocks with a center grip need a special trigger linkage system with a long transfer bar. The calibers changed; with the elimination of the original  barrel, the reduced powder capacity was no longer such a requirement, and the chamberings switched to standard commercial rifle cartridges. By the time the XP-100 was canceled, it faced stiff competition from other bolt-action pistols such as the Savage Striker as well as the versatile Thompson Center Arms break-action Contender.

Model production by year
XP-100 (1963–1985)
XP-100 Varmint Special (1986–1992)
XP-100 Silhouette (1980–1997)
XP-100 Hunter (1993–1994)
XP-100 Custom (1986–1997)
XP-100R (1998)
XR-100 (2005–Present)

Caliber production by year
.221 Remington Fireball (1963–1985)
7 mm BR Remington (1980–1985)
.223 Remington (1986–1997), (2005–Present in XR-100)
.35 Remington (1986–1997)
350 Rem. Mag (1991-1997)
.250 Savage (1990–1992) Custom Shop only
6 mm BR Remington (1990–1992) Custom Shop only
.22-250 Remington (1992–1994) Custom Shop only, (2005–Present in XR-100)
.308 Winchester (1992–1994) Custom Shop only
7 mm-08 Remington (1993–1994)
.204 Ruger (2005–Present in XR-100)

Current production
The XP-100 action was used as the basis for a new single-shot rifle from Remington called the XR-100 Rangemaster.

While the XP-100 has disappeared from Remington's lineup (Remington is primarily a maker of rifles and shotguns), the .221 Fireball remains in production.  The Model 700 rifle has been available since 2002 in a .221 Fireball chambering; while it lacks the velocity attainable with the vastly more popular .223 Remington, the short .221 Fireball delivers most of the performance with far less noise and flash.

Factory recall
In 1979, XP-100 pistols and Remington Model 600 rifles were recalled because of a safety issue. The bolt was fully locked when the safety was on, making it impossible to unload the gun with the safety on. Remington made a free modification available that allowed the bolt to open while the gun was on safe, allowing it to be unloaded while the gun was still on safe.

See also
 FN Five-seven
 List of bullpup firearms
 List of pistols
 Savage Striker
 Thompson/Center Contender

References

External links
 User Manual
 The American Handgunner, Jan/Feb 1979 Coverage
 The American Handgunner, July/Aug 1982 Coverage

Single-shot pistols
.35 Remington firearms
Remington Arms firearms
Bullpup firearms